{{DISPLAYTITLE:C3H2Cl6}}
The molecular formula C3H2Cl6 (molar mass: 250.766 g/mol, exact mass: 247.8288 u) may refer to:

 1,1,1,3,3,3-Hexachloropropane
 1,1,2,2,3,3-Hexachloropropane